Jessica Reedy (born July 12, 1988) is an American gospel singer and songwriter who is best known as the second runner-up on BET's gospel singing competition Sunday Best (season 2) in 2009.

Career 
Reedy's debut album, From The Heart was released on September 27, 2011. The album debuted at No. 1 on the Billboard Gospel Album Chart. The album was received positively by reviewers including Jon Caramanica of the New York Times, who called it "mature and thoughtful".

Reedy's second album, Transparent was released on November 14, 2014. The album debuted at No. 5 on the Billboard Gospel Albums Chart. In 2015, Reedy won a Stellar Award.

Discography

Studio albums

Live albums

 Light Records Unplugged (2013) – Light Records

Singles

Films
 2014 : Who Can I Run To : Tracy

Television appearances

 Black Girls Rock (2014)
 Bobby Jones Gospel (2014)
 Celebration of Gospel (2016,2013, 2012, 2011)
 Pre-Stellar Awards (2013, 2014)
 Stellar Gospel Awards (2012, 2011, 2010)
 Word Network (2013, 2012)
 TBN (2012)
 BET Awards (2012)
 BET's 106 & Park (2012 - debuted music video "Something Out of Nothing")
 Sheryl Lee Ralph's Divas Simply Singing (2011)
 TCT Network (2012, 2011)
 BET's Lift Every Voice (2011)

References

External links
 

1988 births
American gospel singers
Living people
21st-century American singers